Chalastra is a town and former municipality in the Thessaloniki regional unit, Greece. Before 1926, it was known as Κουλουκιά - Kouloukia ( - Kulakiya). It was renamed to Chalastra in 1926, to Πύργος - Pyrgos in 1955 and back to Chalastra in 1980. Since the local government reform of 2011 it has been part of the municipality Delta, of which it is a municipal unit. The town is located 20 km west from the city of Thessaloniki, on the north side of Greek National Road 1, near the Axios river and the Thermaic Gulf. The municipal unit of Chalastra consists of the two communities of Chalastra itself and Anatoliko. The population was 9,859 inhabitants according to the 2011 census, most of them working in agriculture and small industry. The municipal unit Chalastra has an area of 121.415 km2, and the community Chalastra has an area of 98.449 km2.

History
 
[[File:KulakiaGospel.jpg|thumb|160px|The Kulakia Gospel, a Bible written in the native Slavic dialect of Chalastra in 1863 with the Greek alphabet. On the title page there is also inscription "written in Bulgarian language".<ref>Господново и сфетаго евангелио на бога нашаго голема црикфа христианоф, искарено на бугарцко изик тувашно збор на Вардариа за уф неделите сати за гудината и за сати празницити големите за цела година за литургиата. Са писало ут Евстатио Киприади уф селото Колакиа на 30 ноемврио месиц 1863.</ref> ]]

Alex.'' 49; Plin. iv. 10. § 17, xxxi. 10. § 46) was known as a town of Mygdonia in ancient Macedonia, situated on the Thermaikos gulf at the mouth of the Axios river, which belonged to the Thracians and possessed a harbor. A large part of the population was absorbed in Thessaloniki when it was founded by Cassander.

The site of the ancient town is tentatively placed at Anchialos at 
.

During the Byzantine Middle Ages, the name of the area was "Campania".

In the 19th century it was inhabited by a mixed Bulgarian and Greek-speaking population.

References

Populated places in Thessaloniki (regional unit)
Populated places in ancient Macedonia
Cities in ancient Macedonia
Geography of ancient Mygdonia